The Pilgrims' Trail is a  trail in southeastern Slovenia. It runs from Mount Sorrow above Mokronog through Šentrupert, past the Church of St. Francis Xavier in Vesela Gora ("Mount Joy"), and to the Zaplaz Pilgrimage Church in Čatež. The entire walk takes 6 to 7 hours. An organised pilgrimage takes place on the trail every year on the second Sunday of May. The path is maintained by the mountaineering club from Šentrupert, whereas the event is organised by the cultural society of Šentrupert.

External links
 Official page
 The Pilgrimage Trail (map, description). Regional Network of Theme Trails. Slovenia-heritage.net.

Hiking trails in Slovenia
Municipality of Šentrupert